Daikaiju is a Japanese term meaning "giant strange beast" or "great strange beast".

Daikaiju may also refer to:

Daikaiju (band), a kaiju-themed surf rock revival band
 Daikaijū Gamera, a 1965 Japanese kaiju film
 Daikaijū Monogatari, a 1994 role-playing video game
 Daikaijū no Gyakushū, a 1986 shoot 'em up arcade game